Wariboko West (born 19 August 1942) is a Nigerian athlete. He competed in the men's long jump at the 1964 Summer Olympics.

References

1942 births
Living people
Athletes (track and field) at the 1964 Summer Olympics
Nigerian male long jumpers
Olympic athletes of Nigeria
Place of birth missing (living people)